Nancy Harris is an Irish playwright and screenwriter. She was given the Rooney Prize for Irish Literature in 2012.

Early life and education
Harris is the daughter of Anne and Eoghan Harris. She was educated at Trinity College Dublin, earning a B.A. in Drama Studies and Classical Civilization, and the University of Birmingham, where she completed an M.Phil. in Playwriting Studies (a course founded by playwright David Edgar) in the Department of Drama and Theatre Arts.

Career
She was awarded The Stewart Parker Award 2012 for her first original full-length play No Romance which premiered at The Abbey Theatre in Dublin. The play was also nominated for an Irish Times Theatre Award, a Zebbie Award and was a finalist for The Susan Smith Blackburn Prize in 2012. Her play Our New Girl, premiered at The Bush Theatre London and was long-listed for an Evening Standard 'Most Promising Playwright Award' in 2013.

In December 2017, Dublin's Gate Theatre presented Harris' unique spin on a classic fairytale, about the challenges of reimagining The Red Shoes for a new generation.

Harris had two commissioned plays opening in September 2019: The Beacon for Druid Theatre  which premiered at the Town Hall Theatre, Galway before transferring to the Gate Theatre, Dublin in October  and Two Ladies for The Bridge theatre, starring Zoë Wanamaker and Zrinka Cvitešić.

Harris wrote the stage musical adaptation of The Magician's Elephant (based on Kate DiCamillo's novel) with Marc Teitler for the Royal Shakespeare Company Having been delayed a year due to the Covid-19 pandemic, it was rescheduled to premiere in winter 2021.

On television, she was BAFTA nominated for her episodes of the Channel 4 series Dates and contributed scripts for Secret Diary of a Call Girl, The Good Karma Hospital and the epic miniseries Troy: Fall of a City.

She is the screenwriter for The Dry, a comedy about a party girl returning home to Ireland to a troubled family.

Personal life
Harris lives in London. She is married to Ghanaian scientist ,Kwasi Agyei-Owusu.

References

External links
 
 From the Archive: Bushgreen Meets Nancy Harris
 Stewart Parker Trust Award Wins for Nancy Harris, Stacey Gregg and Paul Mercier
 Irish Theatre Magazine review of No Romance

Living people
Year of birth missing (living people)
Alumni of the University of Birmingham
Alumni of Trinity College Dublin
Irish dramatists and playwrights
21st-century Irish writers
Irish women dramatists and playwrights
Women television writers
Irish television writers
21st-century Irish women writers
21st-century Irish screenwriters